Rocuronium bromide (brand names Zemuron, Esmeron) is an aminosteroid non-depolarizing  neuromuscular blocker or muscle relaxant used in modern anaesthesia to facilitate tracheal intubation by providing skeletal muscle relaxation, most commonly required for surgery or mechanical ventilation. It is used for standard endotracheal intubation, as well as for rapid sequence induction (RSI).

Pharmacology

Mechanism of action 
Rocuronium bromide is a competitive antagonist for the Nicotinic acetyl-choline receptors at the neuromuscular junction. Of the Neuromuscular-blocking drugs it is considered to be a non-depolarizing neuromuscular junction blocker, because it acts by dampening the receptor action causing muscle relaxation, instead of continual depolarisation which is the mechanism of action of the depolarizing neuromuscular junction blockers, like succinylcholine.

It was designed to be a weaker antagonist at the neuromuscular junction than pancuronium; hence its monoquaternary structure and its having an allyl group and a pyrrolidine group attached to the D ring quaternary nitrogen atom. Rocuronium has a rapid onset and intermediate duration of action.

There is considered to be a risk of allergic reaction to the drug in some patients (particularly those with asthma), but a similar incidence of allergic reactions has been observed by using other members of the same drug class (non-depolarizing neuromuscular blocking drugs).

The γ-cyclodextrin derivative sugammadex (trade name Bridion) is an agent to reverse the action of rocuronium by binding to it with high affinity. Sugammadex has been in use since 2009 in many European countries; however, it was turned down for approval twice by the US FDA due to concerns over allergic reactions and bleeding, but finally approved the medication for use during surgical procedures in the United States on December 15, 2015. The acetylcholinesterase inhibitor Neostigmine can also be used as a reversal agent of rocuronium but is not as effective as sugammadex. Neostigmine is often still used due to its low cost compared with sugammadex.

History
It was introduced in 1994, and is marketed under the trade name of Zemuron in the United States and Esmeron in most other countries.

Executions 

On July 27, 2012, the U.S. state of Virginia replaced pancuronium bromide, one of the three drugs used in execution by lethal injection, with rocuronium bromide.

On 3 October 2016, the U.S. state of Ohio announced that it would resume executions on January 12, 2017, using a combination of midazolam, rocuronium bromide, and potassium chloride. Prior to this, the last execution in Ohio was in January 2014.

On August 24, 2017, the U.S. state of Florida executed Mark James Asay using a combination of etomidate, rocuronium bromide, and potassium acetate.

References 

Muscle relaxants
Nicotinic antagonists
Quaternary ammonium compounds
4-Morpholinyl compunds
Schering-Plough brands
Merck & Co. brands
Pyrrolidines
Acetate esters
Chemical substances for emergency medicine
Allyl compounds
Neuromuscular blockers
Lethal injection components